The boys' 4 × 100 metre freestyle relay event in swimming at the 2014 Summer Youth Olympics took place on 19 August at the Nanjing Olympic Sports Centre in Nanjing, China.

Results

Heats
The heats were held at 10:52.

Final
The final was held at 19:19.

References

Swimming at the 2014 Summer Youth Olympics
4 × 100 metre freestyle relay